A crow is a bird of the genus Corvus, including ravens and rooks.

Crow, The Crow or Crows may also refer to:

Places

United States
 Crow, Oregon
 Crow, Texas
 Crows, Virginia
 Crow, West Virginia

Elsewhere
 Crow, Hampshire, England
 Crows Ravine, a natural landmark in Uruguay

People
 Crow (surname), people with the surname Crow
 Crow people, a Native American people
 Little Crow (1810–1863), Santee Sioux leader also known as Taoyateduta
 David Loiseau (born 1979), mixed martial arts fighter nicknamed "The Crow"

Arts, entertainment, and media

Comics and manga
 Crows (manga), by Hiroshi Takahashi
 The Crow, a comic book series by James O'Barr
 The Crow (franchise), a media franchise based on the comic

Fictional characters
 Crow (comics), a character in the comic series The Crow
 Crow (Destiny), a character from the Destiny video game series
 Crow, a character in the adventure game The Longest Journey and its sequel, Dreamfall
 Crow Hogan, a character in the anime series Yu-Gi-Oh! 5D's
 Crow T. Robot, a robot in the Mystery Science Theater 3000 television series
 Crows, a nickname for members of the Night's Watch in Game of Thrones
 Crows, a nickname for members of Sons of Anarchy Motorcycle Club, Redwood Original (SAMCRO) in Sons of Anarchy
 Goh "The Crow", a character in the video game Shinobido: Way of the Ninja

Films
 Crows (film), or Wrony, a 1994 film directed by Dorota Kędzierzawska
 The Crow (1919 film), a 1919 Western film directed by B. Reeves Eason
 The Crow (1994 film), a 1994 film based on the comic books, starring Brandon Lee
 The Crow (upcoming film)

Literature 
 Crow (poetry), a literary work by Ted Hughes
 Il corvo (The Crow), a 1762 play by Carlo Gozzi
 "The Crow" (fairy tale), a Slavic fairy tale
 The Crow (novel), a fantasy novel by Alison Croggon

Music

Groups and labels
 Crow (Australian band), an alternative band of the 1990s
 Crow (band), a Minneapolis-based rock band of the late 1960s and early 1970s
 The Crows, an American 1950s rhythm and blues group
 Crow, a 1960s psychedelic rock band of which Donna Summer became the lead singer

Albums and soundtracks
 Crows (album), a 2010 album by singer/songwriter Allison Moorer
 The Crow: New Songs for the 5-String Banjo, a 2009 Steve Martin album
 The Crow (soundtrack), the soundtrack to the 1994 film (see below)

Other arts, entertainment, and media
 Crow, a painting series by Johannes Heisig
 The Crow (card game)
The Crow: Stairway to Heaven, a 1998 Canadian television series

Military and weapons
 Crow (missile), a U.S. Navy ramjet development program
 CROWS, Common Remotely Operated Weapon System

Science and technology
 Crow, a short form for crowbar a prying tool
 Crow butterflies, the milkweed butterfly genus Euploea
 Crow instability, an aerospace phenomenon
 CROW Design Manual for Bicycle Traffic

Sports
 Crow (horse), a Thoroughbred racehorse
 Adelaide Crows, an Australian rules football team

Other uses
 Crow (Australian Aboriginal mythology)
 Crow, one of the steam South Devon Railway 0-4-0 locomotives, Raven class
 Center for Research on Women (CROW), center run by the College of Arts & Sciences, University of Memphis
 Countryside and Rights of Way Act 2000, a British law granting a limited public right to roam
 Crow language, spoken in the Missouri Valley, United States
 Crows (candy), American brand of liquorice confection
 Crows, a nickname given to brothers of the Alpha Chi Rho fraternity

See also
 Jim Crow (disambiguation)
 Crowe (disambiguation)